Maria is a Kenyan prime-time romantic television drama directed by Julian S. Mwanzele. It stars Yasmin Said depicting the eponymous character, alongside Brian Ogana and Bridget Shighadi, in their first television series. It premiered on 10 October 2019, and the last episode aired on 18 March 2021 after 374 episodes. The series aired weekdays on Citizen TV in its 7:30 PM time slot EAT (UTC +03:00) and on Viusasa.

The romantic drama camps around three characters— Maria, a prepossessing adopted ghetto girl; Luwi, the firstborn son of the wealthy Hausa family and Sofia, his wife whose motive is acquiring her connubial family fortune.

Plot 
The fictional story ensues about the life of Maria (Yasmin Said). Without the fortune to meet her parents, she is left under the care of her foster mother, Naomi, who also dies shortly after. She gets adopted by William Hausa, an affluent man from the city's wealthy suburbs, meeting Luwi, the family's eldest son. He plunges in love with her, notwithstanding his licit betrothal to Sofia. Maria learns of his love for her and reciprocates. After divorcing Sofia, Luwi proposes to Maria. Nonethel

less, the much-adored lomomentarilyoveers aroundrss sour when Mardiscoversrns that William, Luwi's dad, had a hand in the killing of her father and the acquisition of his wealth. When it is revealed that Victor isn't William's biological son, he banishes the entihouseholdily from their house and does all sorts indulgencesnce but later gets deranged. Victor is both Sofia's paternal and Luwi's maternal half-brother, divulgedled while the story gets a new twist. Willisurvivesersa pernicioushal accident that leaves him l. Also, er his conspiratorial plot with Meja, his house manager, gets Sandra locked behind bars. Betrayed by love, Sandra, who has always beenchantedted asmittensed with William, promises to retaliate. Maria, who had once planned to sue William for his past mistakes, sympathizes with him alastly resorts to forgivingves him. Maria agrees to Luwi's second-time proposal, and they both plan their wedding day. Coincidentally, Sofia is fortuitously shot and killed on the wedding day by Brenda, whose target is Maria. Silas proposes to Vanessa, much to Maggie's dismay, because she loves him, while William gets apprehended and later incarcerated, having been convicted for his crime. A few months have passed, and the newlywed couple is expecting a child. Luwi and Maria are touring Maasai Mara as they express their love and anticipate a lucid future.

Love interests in Maria 
 Luwi and Maria
 Silas and Vanessa
 Victor and Sonia
 Victor and Delilah

Cast and characters 
Sources:

Main cast 
Yasmin Said as Maria Tino
Bridget Shighadi as Sofia
Brian Martins Ogana as Luwi Hausa
Ronald Ndubi as Victor
Dennis Musyoka as Boss William Hausa
Sheila Ndanu as Madam Victoria Hausa (aka Vickie)
Wanjiku Stephens as Vanessa Hausa

Supporting cast 
Linda Alexette as Tobi
Teddy Brown as Fali
Belinda Joana as Kobi
Aisha Hussein as Gloria
Umar Hussein as Pupa
Abdalla Ali as Jayden
Botul Abdalla as Marianne
Beatrice Dorea as Maggie
Blessing Lung'aho as Meja
Carol Kipsuto as Sandra
Periz Wambui as Salome
Terry Ombaka as Naomi
Robert Budi as Trevor
Grace Obuya as Sister Teresa
Tina Njambi as Lorna
Christopher Kamau as Daniel
Maureen Wangare as Brenda
Edna Nguka as Delilah
Musa Ore as Father Ezekiel
Nyakundi Isaboke as Silas
Timothy Musyoka as Ben
Tindo Mwanzele as Mwambe
Suzie Malaki as Rufina
Quincy Ando as Thomas
Edwin Buni as Koros
Sarah Malaki as Mama Chapo
Alice Mari as Kanini
Jane Mulanda as Dogo
Joseph Kiplabatt as Collo
Anthony Ashioya as Tekno
Brian Kibochi as Bondi

Cameo 
Aseem Sharma as Sonia

Reception 
Source:

Reruns 
The reruns of weekday episodes of the show aired every Saturday at 4 PM EAT (UTC +03:00) until 20 March 2021.

See also 

 Kalasha Awards Winners since 2009

Awards and nominations 

|-
| rowspan="3" |2020
| rowspan="3" | Kalasha Film & TV Awards
| Best Lead Actress in TV Drama
| Yasmin Said
| style="background: #99FF99;text-align: center;" rowspan="2" | Won
| 

|-
| Best TV Drama
| Maria (TV series)
| 

|-
| Best Lead Actor in TV Drama
| Brian Ogana
| 
|

References 

2018 Kenyan television series debuts
2021 Kenyan television series endings
Citizen TV original programming